Dagný Linda Kristjánsdóttir (born 8 November 1980) is an Icelandic alpine skier. She competed at the 2002 Winter Olympics and the 2006 Winter Olympics.

References

1980 births
Living people
Dagný Linda Kristjánsdóttir
Dagný Linda Kristjánsdóttir
Alpine skiers at the 2002 Winter Olympics
Alpine skiers at the 2006 Winter Olympics
Dagný Linda Kristjánsdóttir
21st-century Icelandic women